The 2010–11 Women's A Basketball League of Serbia was the 5th season of the First Women's Basketball League of Serbia, Serbia's highest-level professional basketball league. It was also known as the 67th national championship, and included Serbian clubs from the nation's previous incarnations as Yugoslavia and Serbia and Montenegro.

The first part of the season consisted of 72 games played between nine different teams (nine games for each team). The season began on 9 October 2010 and ended on 19 February 2011. The second part of the season, referred to as "Superleague", featured inter-league play between four teams from the Adriatic League and four teams from the First Women's Basketball League of Serbia. The third part of the season featured two parts, Playoffs and Play-Out.

Team information

Regular season
The regular season, which ran from 9 October 2010 to 19 February 2011, consisted of dual circuit play between nine teams. Each team played one home game and one away game. The four best teams at the end of the regular season moved on to the Superleague, while the remaining teams moved on to Play Out.

Superleague
The Superleague, which ran from 9 March 2011 to April 2011, consisted of dual circuit play between eight teams, four each from the Adriatic League and the First Women's Basketball League of Serbia. Each team played one home game and one away game. The four best teams at the end of the regular season moved on to the playoffs.

Playoffs
The playoffs, which ran from 13 April to 25 April 2011, proceeded according to the cup system. The semifinals were played at 2 wins, the final at 3 wins.

Play Out
Play Out, which ran from 9 March 2011 to 16 April 2011, was played as a round robin. The worst ranked team, ŽKK Kovin, was relegated to the Second League of Serbia.

Awards
Player of the Year: Dajana Butulija (175-86) of Partizan
Guard of the Year: Dajana Butulija (175-86) of Partizan
Forward of the Year: Aleksandra Čabarkapa (186-F-86) of Vojvodina
Center of the Year: Jela Vidačić (190-C-85) of Proleter Zrenjanin
Import Player of the Year: Latoya Williams (193-C-87) of Partizan
Domestic Player of the Year: Dajana Butulija (175-86) of Partizan
Defensive Player of the Year: Latoya Williams (193-C-87) of Partizan
Coach of the Year: Marina Maljković of Partizan

1st Team
G: Dajana Butulija (175-86) of Partizan
G: Sanja Orozović (184-90) of Spartak Subotica
G: Milica Dabović (175-82) of Partizan
F/C: Tina Jovanović (192-91) of Radivoj Korać
C: Jela Vidačić (190-85) of Proleter Zrenjanin

2nd Team
G: Tamara Radočaj (168-87) of Hemofarm
G: Jovana Popović (173-90) of Crvena zvezda
F: Aleksandra Čabarkapa (186-86) of Vojvodina
C: Vladinka Erak (190-84) of Vojvodina
C: Latoya Williams (193-87) of Partizan

Honorable Mention
Biljana Stanković (176-G-74) of Hemofarm
Milana Živadinović (173-G-91) of Vojvodina
Marija Ilić (190-C-85) of Student Niš
Ana Nikšić (181-F-91) of Crvena zvezda
Dara Kovačević (197-C-83) of Hemofarm
Tijana Ajduković (197-C-91) of Hemofarm

External links
 Women's A Basketball League of Serbia at eurobasket.com
 Regular season at srbijasport.net
 Superleague at srbijasport.net
 Play Off at srbijasport.net
 Play Out at srbijasport.net

First Women's Basketball League of Serbia seasons
Serbia
women